Vivekananda Degree College is the only Degree college in Ichoda Mandal which is established in 2006 and is affiliated to Kakatiya University of Telangana, India. The college has its campus at Ichoda, Adilabad. The college runs degree courses in Computer Science, Arts, Science, Commerce and Management.

History
Established in 2006 by Surukunti Sridhar Reddy and Surukunti Srinivas Reddy, this college has long been providing Bachelor's Degree education to students from not only Ichoda mandal but all over from Adilabad District. The college is named after the great saint Swami Vivekananda in recognition of his exceptional work in spreading the wisdom not only across India, but also across the world.

Campus
Vivekananda College campus is spread over an area of about 5 acres, The College has a large playground for sports, games and other athletics need.

Library
College library is located very close to the academic building. The library follows an open-access system and allows outsiders too to use books of referral worth.

Hostel
The hostels for boys and girls are available at a very subsidized rate for students from remote places and are situated within the campus. They also have individual attached mess to cater to meals for hostelers.

See also 
Education in India
Literacy in India
List of institutions of higher education in Telangana

References

External links

Universities and colleges in Telangana
Adilabad district
Educational institutions established in 2006
2006 establishments in Andhra Pradesh